Andrew "Drew" Dilkens is a Canadian politician, who is the 34th and current mayor of Windsor, Ontario. He was elected mayor in the city's 2014 municipal election. Dilkens is married to Jane Deneau, and has two children.

Biography 
Dilkens studied at the University of Windsor, earning a Bachelor of Commerce degree and a law degree. He was called to the bar in 2012. He then studied at Wayne State University where he obtained a Master of Business Administration, and at the International School of Management in Paris, where he obtained a Doctorate of Business Administration. In 2021, he earned the Chartered Director (C.Dir.) designation. Dilkens holds the designation of Certified Human Resources Leader, and has training certificates from the Canadian Foreign Service Institute and the Canadian Securities Institute and Federal Bureau of Investigation in the United States.

Before being elected mayor, Dilkens was elected in 2006 to serve as a city councillor for Ward 1 from 2006 to 2014. He ran largely on a campaign of continuing the policy agenda of outgoing mayor Eddie Francis. During his time on City Council, Dilkens chaired the International Relations Committee and the Essex Windsor Solid Waste Authority.

Mayor of Windsor

Road infrastructure and flood prevention 
In August 2017, the City of Windsor received a record-breaking rainstorm, flooding 6000 basements. Dilkens was criticized for promoting a $3 million dollar project to create a Christmas lights display amidst the mass flooding. Critics claimed that the city was responsible for the flooding by not properly investing in infrastructure, pressuring the city to re-invest the lights display fund. Mayor Dilkens dismissed the critics, stating: "There will be folks who will criticize lots of different decisions". Mayor Dilkens also noted that the City of Windsor has invested $12-million to the flooding prevention program. However, council eventually voted to roll back the budget of the Christmas display to $1.5 million. Between 2021 and 2022 over 100,000 people attended the event. In 2022, Canadian Special Events magazine released its list of the 2022 Canadian Event Awards Finalists with Bright Lights Windsor being nominated for both Best Outdoor Event, and Most Outstanding Event.

In response to the storm, Dilkens presented an eight-point plan to address flooding in the City of Windsor. This plan set in motion the city's Master Sewer Plan, which enables the city to identify issues, find solutions, and execute major sewer projects. The total cost of the sewer master plan is $5-billion.

COVID-19 pandemic 
The City of Windsor’s response to the pandemic included:

 Declaration of a state of emergency
 Ordering the temporary closure of malls and shopping centers
 Launching a Small Business Action Plan, waiving some permit fees
 Advocating for the elimination of time-of-use electricity rates
 Temporarily closing all community centres and libraries
 Supporting the June 27th Miracle food drive
 Launching #TakeoutTuesday to support small businesses and restaurants.

Economy
When running for re-election in 2018, Dilkens promised to "hold the line" on taxes, meaning to keep the municipal tax rate below the rate of inflation. From 2014 to 2018, the city budget increased 2.4 per cent under Dilkens' watch. Dilkens claimed that the city's tax policy has helped save taxpayers $659-million since 2008. In subsequent years, tax increases were below 2 per cent, the target inflation rate, with the exception of 2020 which saw an increase of 2.1 per cent. These tax increases are notably lower than those that surrounding municipalities implemented.

In March 2022, Dilkens helped in securing a $5-billion investment for Canada’s first domestic EV battery manufacturing facility. Once created, the plant will employ 2,500 people. In addition, it is expected that spinoff jobs created in the supply chain will be between 10,000 and 17,500.

In May 2022, Dilkens joined Premier Ford, Prime Minister Justin Trudeau, cabinet ministers, and Stellantis executives to announce Stellantis’ $3.6-billion investment towards modernizing their assembly plant to accommodate for the production of electric vehicles, while also building two new research and development centres. Through the new centres, 650 jobs will be created and third-shift operations will return once retooling is complete.

In June 2022, Dilkens joined Dongshin Motech Ltd. CEO Choon Woo Lim to approve their lease terms and Letter of Intent to build a $60-million, 170,000-square-foot manufacturing facility. This new space will produce highly specialized aluminium casings for the electric vehicle batteries at the LGES-Stellantis EV Battery Production Facility and provide 300 new jobs.

Regional acute care hospital 

In 2014, a grassroots group called "Citizens for an Accountable Mega-Hospital Planning Process" (CAMPP) was formed to appeal decisions to amalgamate local healthcare into a "mega-hospital", located on the outskirts of the city, a plan supported by Dilkens. CAMPP, claiming thousands of supporters, promoted community involvement in the decision-making process, and "financially, socially and environmentally responsible sound urban planning principles". CAMPP expressed concerns that the planned hospital would fail to meet the needs of the urban core populations, instead focusing on a plan for urban sprawl that centres new suburban developments. CAMPP also stressed a lack of consultation with Indigenous locals.

A long process of deliberations and public appeals by CAMPP ensued over the following years. When the Downtown Windsor BIA contributed to CAMPP's campaign, Dilkens threatened to dissolve the organization. In 2019, Dilkens was criticized for social media comments which appeared to dismiss vandalism perpetrated against one of the CAMPP supporters.

CAMPP was denied leave to appeal Ontario’s Divisional Court in July 2020, and the mega hospital will be built on the corner of County Road 42 and the 9th Concession. It will be a $1.6-million square foot, 10-storey acute-care hospital. Dilkens and other proponents of building the mega hospital often cite crumbling infrastructure, lack of space, and hygiene issues in Windsor’s current hospitals, as well as the need for a COVID-19 field hospital at the St. Clair Sportsplex.  Dilkens commented, "I think COVID has only exposed the frailty of every system, including our health-care system locally, where you have to open a field hospital, where you have in some cases a (hospital) ward room with five patients and a bathroom down the hall. It’s truly like 100-year-old health care."

Environment 
In 2015, a petition garnering 12,000 signatures urged Dilkens to retract municipal approval for a commercial development near the Ojibway Prairie Complex. Local environmental advocates, including the activist group Save Ojibway, argued that the development would threaten local wildlife and damage the adjacent nature reserve.

In 2017, Dilkens rejected a related proposal to close Matchette Road, which runs between Ojibway Park and the Ojibway Prairie Provincial Nature Reserve. Citizen groups proposed that closing the road would drastically reduce wildlife deaths from traffic. The council rejected the motion, with Dilkens' support. Dilkens stated: "To move forward with closure of Matchette Road at this time would certainly have put this corporation in a great deal of jeopardy". During the council meeting, security personnel removed several citizens who voiced their objection to a presentation by developer CoCo Paving.

For the second year in a row, the City of Windsor earned an "A" from the Carbon Disclosure Project for its efforts on climate action in 2020. Windsor was among the 88 cities worldwide to receive an "A". The average score for North American cities was a "C". 
In 2021, Dilkens, Councillor Jo-Anne Gignac, Tree Canada, and the Canadian National Railway, announced that 60 trees will be planted in public properties across the City of Windsor to help expand the City’s urban tree canopy and support the health and resilience of Windsor’s environment. The City of Windsor has also doubled its tree-planting program in 2021 to 2,000 trees and since 2019, has invested $3.8 million to expand, protect, and manage the community’s tree canopy.

Policing and public safety 
As a city councillor, Dilkens attracted media attention and criticism by proposing "no panhandling" zones, describing panhandlers as "accosting, annoying, and interfering." Local charity and social workers criticized the move as "dehumanizing" and failing to address or understand poverty. Dilkens defended his position, claiming that panhandling makes residents and families uncomfortable and stating that it is "incumbent upon us" to create a safe and welcoming environment downtown.

Following the retirement of Al Frederick in 2019, Pam Mizuno was named as Windsor's first female police chief. The Windsor Police Services Board, which Dilkens is chair of, made the decision to appoint her.

In 2019, Dilkens was asked by local reporters his stance on an unsanctioned overdose prevention site, which had been set up to help combat the opioid epidemic. In response, Dilkens, who strongly opposed the site, said "It's not even worth it" to comment on it. In 2022, Dilkens voted against a drug consumption and treatment site, breaking a tie between the 10 city councillors. Dilkens cited concern over the location and the impact the site would have on neighbouring businesses.

In 2019, Dilkens and City Council approved the purchase of 20 surveillance cameras for Downtown Windsor to monitor events in real-time and to help make modifications to traffic flow as needed. In 2020, Dilkens and City Council approved the installation of 10 new red light cameras. The cameras were installed and made operational in 2021.

On February 6, 2022, a group of freedom convoy protestors arrived on Huron Church Road and created a blockade. This posed a major risk to the national economy, since the main access point to the Ambassador Bridge, which carries up to $450-million in trade with the United States every day, was choked off by the protestors. The protests were called for an end to vaccine mandates and COVID-19 restrictions. Windsor's Chief of Police, Pam Mizuno, asked the federal and provincial governments to assist in providing additional police officers and equipment to handle the situation. On February 10, Dilkens sought a court injunction to remove the protestors, which was granted on February 11, giving police additional capabilities to arrest and remove protestors. To support the ongoing police response to the blockade, Dilkens declared a state of emergency on February 14, which lasted 10 days. The response to the blockade cost the City of Windsor $5.6-million. Dilkens has been pressuring the federal and provincial governments to compensate the City of Windsor for these costs, saying that "It just shouldn't fall on the backs of the taxpayers of the City of Windsor."

On August 10, 2022, Dilkens was appointed by the Ontario government to serve as the chair of the Housing Supply Action Plan Implementation Team. The team is tasked with advising the government on ways to address homelessness and housing affordability in Ontario.

Arts, culture, and heritage 
On May 26, 2018, two years after construction started, was the grand opening of Windsor's new city hall.

In 2018, Dilkens and City Council committed $5.6-million for development of the Riverfront Festival Plaza.

In 2020, Dilkens and City Council approved $7-million for the Celestial Beacon project to house Streetcar No. 351 on the riverfront. In 2022, Dilkens and City Council committed $750,000 to restoring Streetcar No. 351, which now lives at the Celestial Beacon in Assumption Park.

In 2022, Dilkens appointed Theresa Sims as the inaugural Indigenous Storyteller, and Teajai Travis as the first Multicultural Community Storyteller.

In July 2022, in honour of Hiram Walker's 206th birthday, Dilkens unveiled a bronze statue of Walker at Hiram Walker Parkette (Devonshire Road at Riverside Drive East).

Electoral record 
The following is a list of candidates and their results. Incumbents are noted with an (X). Elected officials are in bold.

2003 Windsor municipal election results, Ward 1 councillor

2006 Windsor municipal election results, Ward 1 councillor

2010 windsor municipal election results, Ward 1 councillor

2014 Windsor municipal election results, Mayor of Windsor

2018 Windsor municipal election results, Mayor of Windsor

2022 Windsor municipal election results, Mayor of Windsor

References

Mayors of Windsor, Ontario
Living people
1972 births
University of Windsor alumni
Wayne State University alumni